Fráech mac Finchada or Fróech mac Findchado (died 495) was a king of Leinster. Fráech was a member of the Dál Messin Corb dynasty's principal sub-sept, the Uí Garrchon. He succeeded his father, Fincath mac Garrchu, (died 485). He ruled from 485 to 495.

The annals record a defeat of the Leinstermen at the Battle of Taillten in 494 by Coirpre mac Néill. This is associated with the Ui Neill conquest of Brega and the taking of Tailtiu. In 495 Fráech was defeated and slain by Eochu mac Coirpri at the second Battle of Grainaret (Granard, County Longford) in Tethba.

Notes

See also
Kings of Leinster

References
 Annals of Ulster at CELT: Corpus of Electronic Texts at University College Cork
 Annals of Tigernach at CELT: Corpus of Electronic Texts at University College Cork
 Charles-Edwards, T. M. (2000), Early Christian Ireland, Cambridge: Cambridge University Press,  
 Byrne, Francis John (2001), Irish Kings and High-Kings, Dublin: Four Courts Press, 
 Book of Leinster,Rig Laigin at CELT: Corpus of Electronic Texts at University College Cork
 Ireland, 400-800, pp. 188, by Dáibhí Ó Cróinín A New History of Ireland, Vol.I,  (edited Ó Cróinín).

External links
CELT: Corpus of Electronic Texts at University College Cork includes: Gein Branduib (original & translation), Annals of Ulster, Annals of Tigernach, Annals of Innisfallen and others.

5th-century births
495 deaths
Kings of Leinster
5th-century Irish monarchs
Dál Messin Corb